William Fung Kwok Lun OBE JP (born 21 February 1949) is a Hong Kong billionaire businessman who is the group managing director of Li & Fung Group, one of the largest trading companies in Hong Kong.

Early life
Fung was born in 1949 in Hong Kong. He attended Princeton University in its class of 1970, majoring in electrical engineering. He subsequently earned an MBA from Harvard Business School in 1972.

Fung is one of two sons of Fung Hon-chu, former head of Li & Fung, and grandson of Fung Pak Liu, founder of the family firm. He is the younger brother of Victor Fung Kwok King, the chairman of the group.

Career
Fung joined the family firm, and helped it expand to Taiwan, South Korea, Singapore and China.

Fung is a non-executive director of HSBC Holdings, CLP Holdings Limited, VTech Holdings Limited, Shui On Land Limited and Singapore Airlines.

Fung served as the international chair of the Pacific Economic Cooperation Council from 1999 to 2001.

Philanthropy
Fund endowed the "Fung Scholarship" at his alma mater, Princeton University. In 2009, he was appointed to the university's board of trustees.

Personal
Fung is married with three children and, like his brother Victor, holds American citizenship.

See also
 List of Princeton University people

References

1949 births
Living people
Officers of the Order of the British Empire
Hong Kong chief executives
Hong Kong billionaires
Li & Fung
HSBC people
Princeton University School of Engineering and Applied Science alumni
Harvard Business School alumni
Members of the Selection Committee of Hong Kong
Members of the Preparatory Committee for the Hong Kong Special Administrative Region
Hong Kong Basic Law Consultative Committee members
New Hong Kong Alliance politicians